CBC Radio 3 Sessions, Vol. 1 is a compilation album released in 2004, compiling tracks from live sessions performed on CBC Radio 3.

Track listing 
 Sloan - "Losing California" (3:02)
 The New Pornographers - "The Fake Headlines" (2:52)
 Hot Hot Heat - "Le Le Low" (3:08)
 The Hidden Cameras - "Music is My Boyfriend" (3:18)
 The Dears - "Expect the Worst/'Cos She's a Tourist" (7:45)
 Kid Koala - "Drunk Trumpet" (4:02)
 Manitoba - "Leila" (6:19)
 BrassMunk - "Push Up" (2:50)
 The Organ - "A Sudden Death" (2:52)
 Tricky Woo - "Hot Kitty" (2:47)
 The Constantines - "Blind Luck" (3:36)
 Rheostatics - "Harmelodia (Easy to Be With You)" (3:46)
 The Sadies - "I Tried Not To" (2:10)
 Buck 65 - "The Anthem" (3:51)
 John K. Samson - "Utilities" (3:38)
 Oh Susanna - "King's Road" (3:02)

References 

01
2004 compilation albums